The Gettysburg Campaign was a campaign of the American Civil War in 1863. The Union and Confederate forces fought between June 3 and July 24 in southern Pennsylvania, Maryland, and northern Virginia. The main and namesake battle of the campaign was the Battle of Gettysburg, which was fought from July 1 to July 3 in and around the town of Gettysburg, Pennsylvania. The battle involved the largest number of casualties of the entire war and is often described as a turning point of the civil war. The Medal of Honor was awarded to 73 Union soldiers for 7 different actions of the campaign.

The Medal of Honor was created during the American Civil War in 1862. It was, and to-date is, the highest military decoration presented by the United States government to a member of its armed forces. The recipients must have distinguished themselves at the risk of their own life above and beyond the call of duty in action against an enemy of the United States. The award criteria have been modified over time and thus the current criteria do not match those used for awards during the Civil  War. Due to the nature of this medal it is commonly, though by far not exclusively, awarded posthumously.



Recipients

References

See also
Battle of Gettysburg
List of American Civil War Medal of Honor recipients

External links
 The Medal of Honor at Gettysburg

Battle of Gettysburg
American Civil War-related lists
Gettysburg campaign
Pennsylvania-related lists
Maryland-related lists
Virginia-related lists